Sha Kiu Tsuen is a village in Yuen Long District, New Territories, Hong Kong.

External links

 Delineation of area of existing village Sha Kiu Tsuen (I) (Ping Shan) for election of resident representative (2019 to 2022)
 Delineation of area of existing village Sha Kiu Tsuen (II) (Ping Shan) for election of resident representative (2019 to 2022)

Villages in Yuen Long District, Hong Kong